Brescello (in the local dialect,  in the Reggio Emilia dialect) is a comune (municipality) in the Province of Reggio Emilia in the Italian region Emilia-Romagna, located about  northwest of Bologna and about  northwest of Reggio Emilia.  As of 31 December 2016, it had a population of 5,621.

Geography
Situated in the northwestern side of the province, close to the borders with the provinces of Parma and Mantua (Mantua is in Lombardy), Brescello lies on the southern shore of the river Po, near the confluence with the Enza. The municipality borders Boretto, Gattatico, Mezzani, Poviglio, Sorbolo and Viadana.

History
Located near the Po river, remains of this ancient town's Roman roots – it was called Brixellum or Brixillum during the Roman era – can still be seen in the Antiquarium, via Cavallotti 12 (a former Benedictine monastery), where ancient Roman relics and sculptures are on display. A bishop Cyprianus of Brixillum was present at a synod held in Milan in 451, but the bishopric came to an end when in the early 7th century the Byzantines destroyed the town to prevent it falling into the hands of the Lombard king Agilulf. No longer a residential bishopric, Brixillum is now listed by the Catholic Church as a titular see.

Today, the town is most famous for being the set for   the   film series of Peppone and Don Camillo, played by Gino Cervi and Fernandel and based on the books by Giovannino Guareschi. Brescello has dedicated a museum to these two characters, which houses many props, including a tank which was used in a scene from Don Camillo e l'onorevole Peppone ("Don Camillo's Last Round").

Main sights

Church of Santa Maria Nascente
The current church was rebuilt between 1829 and 1837 replacing the ancient medieval church that once stood here. Inside it has a nave and two aisles with six side altars, three on each side, with large archways that divide the nave from the aisles, and an impressive wooden crucifix by Bruno Avesani.  On the side of the main altar, there is a plaster statue of Padre Pio made by the local sculptor Carlo Pisi, and in the curvature of the apse, there is the chorus seating made from inlaid wood, with a large painting by Carlo Zatti above it. The original altar is now located in the central chapel in the left aisle. Near it is the wooden, carved, gold-leaf central pulpit. The facade, dominated by the 1896 bell tower, has two statues, one of the Virgin and one of the patron Saint Genesius, both by Innocente Franceschini, and placed on the facade in 1899. The bell tower has five bells.

On the night of April 5, 2010, a fire destroyed a modern altar and damaged some furniture.

Former monastery of San Benedetto
This Benedictine monastery was built in the 15th century for the secluded monks of the Saint Benedict order, who remained there until the beginning of the Cisalpine Republic.   Completely renovated, it is now home to a Cultural Center which houses the Museum of Peppone and Don Camillo, a day care, the library, the Municipal Council, the Auser Center and the Municipal Police.

Parco Giovannino Guareschi
Adjacent to the Museum, is a park where the remaining part of the original church of the old cloister of the Benedictine monks can be seen.  In the center of the park there is the bust of Giovannino Guareschi, inaugurated in 1995.

People 
Antonio Panizzi, patriot, librarian and bibliographer 
Mario Nizolio, philosopher and scholar

Events

Brescello Film Festival
Begun in 2003, the festival is dedicated to documentaries and works of fiction that focus on Italy: its places, environment, traditions, values and culture. The event is promoted by the Municipality of Brescello together with the Pro Loco Association and the Videoclub of Brescello, with the patronage of the Minister of Foreign Affairs and the Minister of Cultural Activities and Heritage. The 2015 festival was held on June 20–23.

La Notte dell'Imperatore - Brixellum Romanorum  – Historical Reenactment
This two-day event, taking place in June every other year, is an historical reenactment organised by the local archeological society. The event is organised to celebrate and remember the events which connect the village to the Roman emperor Otho (who committed suicide there). During the event it is possible to experience how life in Ancient Rome was thanks to the many workshops, the ludi, the traditional market on the main square and the traditional dinner taking place during the evening. The 2015 edition was held on June 13–14.

References

External links

 Official website 

Cities and towns in Emilia-Romagna